Rina Cjuro (born 23 February 1998) is a Peruvian long-distance runner. She competed in the senior women's race at the 2019 IAAF World Cross Country Championships held in Aarhus, Denmark. She finished in 82nd place.

In 2016, she competed in the women's 3000 metres steeplechase event at the IAAF World U20 Championships held in Bydgoszcz, Poland. In 2017, she competed in the junior women's race at the IAAF World Cross Country Championships held in Kampala, Uganda. She finished in 42nd place.

She competed in the women's 3000 metres steeplechase event at the 2019 Pan American Games held in Lima, Peru. She finished in 7th place with a personal best of 10:08.12.

References

External links 
 

Living people
1998 births
Place of birth missing (living people)
Peruvian female long-distance runners
Peruvian female cross country runners
Peruvian female steeplechase runners
Pan American Games competitors for Peru
Athletes (track and field) at the 2019 Pan American Games
South American Games gold medalists for Peru
South American Games medalists in athletics
South American Games gold medalists in athletics
Athletes (track and field) at the 2018 South American Games
21st-century Peruvian women